This is a list of known Lockheed F-104 Starfighter survivors.  Please see the Canadair CF-104 Starfighter, Lockheed NF-104A and Aeritalia F-104S pages for their known survivors.

Belgium
F-104G
26+47 German Air Force – at company at Tessenderlo.
FX04 Belgian Air Force – 1st Wing Historical Center at Beauvechain Air Base.
FX12 Belgian Air Force – Royal Museum of the Armed Forces and Military History, Brussels.
FX15 Belgian Air Force – stored at the 1st Wing Historical Center at Beauvechain Air Base.
FX21 Belgian Air Force – Headquarters of the Belgian Air Force at Evere.
FX39 Belgian Air Force – stored with the 10th Tactical Wing at Kleine Brogel.
FX47 Belgian Air Force – 1st Wing Historical Center at Beauvechain Air Base.
FX53 Belgian Air Force – gate-guard at the Technical School of the Air Force, Saffraanberg near Sint-Truiden.
FX61 Belgian Air Force – stored with the 10th Tactical Wing at Kleine Brogel.
FX76 Belgian Air Force – stored at a factory next to the E40 Motorway at Zaventem.
FX79 Belgian Air Force – top of a sea container at a scrap dealer next to the E3 Motorway at Lochristi-Beervelde.
FX86 Belgian Air Force – front of the officers mess at the 10th Tactical Wing at Kleine Brogel.
FX94 Belgian Air Force – on a roundabout at the N73-Kiezel Kleine-Brogel in front of the Belgian Air Base Kleine Brogel.
FX99 Belgian Air Force – The last Belgian Starfighter to fly was preserved/stored with International Vintage Aircraft at Markham, Ontario but was bought by Peter Mullens to be brought over to a location at Helchteren in Belgium.
FX100 Belgian Air Force – stored in the same location as the FX76.

Canada

F-104A
12700 Royal Canadian Air Force – on display at the Canada Aviation and Space Museum in Ottawa, Ontario.

CF-104
On display at the Atlantic Canada Aviation Museum.

TF-104G
D-5805 Royal Netherlands Air Force – Alberta Aviation Museum.

Czech Republic
F-104G
FX93 Belgian Air Force  – Air Park Zruc u Plzne.

France

F-104G
22+40 German Air Force – Musée de l'Air et de l'Espace, Le Bourget Airport, Paris.
21+91 German Air Force – Ailes Anciennes Toulouse.
FX90 Belgian Air Force – Savigny-lès-Beaune.

TF-104G
FC08 Belgian Air Force – Savigny-lès-Beaune.

Germany
F-104F
29+03 – Deutsches Museum Flugwerft Schleissheim  at Oberschleißheim in the northern suburbs of Munich.

F-104G
20+07 – At a private collection in Freiberg, Germany.
20+37 – Luftwaffenmuseum der Bundeswehr at Berlin-Gatow
20+43 – Flugausstellung Hermeskeil.
20+45 – Aviation Museum Hannover-Laatzen at Hannover.
20+81 (painted as 23+81) – at the air base in Schleswig, Schleswig-Holstein, Germany
21+55 - Flugplatz Haßfurt
21+53 – Deutsches Museum at Munich.
21+56 – Luftfahrt- und Technik-Museumspark, Merseburg.
22+06 - Unteroffiziersschule der Luftwaffe Appen, USLw
22+45 – Wernigerode.
22+49 – Auto & Technik Museum Sinsheim, Sinsheim.
22+58 – "Traditionsgemeinschaft JaboG-34", in Memmingen, Germany.
23+09 – (Marineflieger) – Wernigerode.
25+49 – Wernigerode (front fuselage only).
26+49 – Luftwaffenmuseum der Bundeswehr at Berlin-Gatow.
26+53 – Gerhard Neumann Museum, Niederalteich.
26+63 – Technik Museum Speyer, Speyer.
DB+127 ZLL – Luftwaffenmuseum der Bundeswehr at Berlin-Gatow.
FX60 – Belgian Air Force – preserved at the Flugausstellung Hermeskeil.
21+69 – Nörvenich Air Base at Nörvenich.
23+76 (painted as 22+90) German Air Force – at a small aircraft collection in Winterberg/Niedersfeld.
FX69 Belgian Air Force – fuselage stored at Weeze Airport.

F-104G-CCV
98+36 – German Air Force – Wehrtechnische Studiensammlung Koblenz, Koblenz.

TF-104G
27+90 – Luftwaffenmuseum der Bundeswehr at Berlin-Gatow
28+27 – Technik Museum Speyer, Speyer.
29+06 – Luftwaffenmuseum der Bundeswehr at Berlin-Gatow

Greece

F-104G
FX52 Belgian Air Force – Palis Foundation at Karelias Koropiou, Greece.
FG-695 Hellenic Air Force – Athens War Museum, Greece.
32720/FG-720 Hellenic Air Force Museum, named "Tiger."
FG-7151 Hellenic Air Force Museum, named "Olympus."
FG-425 Tragano village central square, Ilia, next to 117 Combat Wing.

Hungary
F-104G
21+64 German Air Force – Hungarian Museum of Hungarian Aviation, Szolnok.

Italy
The Italian Air Force was a major user of F-104s, and the last air force to withdraw the aircraft from its front line. More than 100 F-104s are in display in Italy. A complete list is available here.

TF-104G
MM54228 Italian Air Force – Turin Airport
F-104
3-01 Italian Air Force – Trento Airport

Japan
Over 51 F-104's are preserved across Japan. A complete list is available here.

F-104J
26-5007 JASDF – Kawaguchiko Motor Museum, Narusawa, Yamanashi
36-8515 JASDF – Kakamigahara Aerospace Museum, Kakamigahara, Gifu.
36-8552 JASDF – Family Spot Park in Chippubetsu, Hokkaido, near Hokkaido AFB.
36-8687 JASDF – Top of a mountain in Okayama
56-8662 JASDF – Displayed at Fuchū Air Base, Tokyo
76-8688 JASDF – Naha Air Base
46-8574 JASDF – Gate guardian at Chitose Air Base
76-8706 JASDF – On the roof of the Hasegawa Corporation, at their headquarters in Yaizu, Shizuoka.

Jordan
F-104A
s/n unknown – Royal Jordanian Air Force – University of Jordan, Amman, known as the Muath al-Kasasbeh memorial.
s/n unknown – Royal Jordanian Air Force – road between Ajloun and Andara, Ajloun Governorate.

F-104B
902 – Royal Jordanian Air Force – Prince al Hassan St., Madaba.

Netherlands
F-104G
21+73 German Air Force – for sale at PS Aero in Baarlo.
22+90 German Air Force - Gate Guard at Aviodrome, Lelystad, painted in bright red.
24+63 German Air Force – for sale at PS Aero in Baarlo, painted as 'D-8212' (Royal Netherlands Air Force).
26+02 German Air Force Schagen factory at Hasselt, Painted as 'D-8029'.
26+72 Marineflieger – for sale at PS Aero in Baarlo.
D-8022 Royal Netherlands Air Force – on display at Nationaal Militair Museum, Soesterberg.
D-8051 Royal Netherlands Air Force – on display at Leeuwarden Air Base
D-8053 Royal Netherlands Air Force – on display at Air Operations Control Station Nieuw-Milligen
D-8061 Royal Netherlands Air Force – on display at Aviodrome, Lelystad
D-8114 Royal Netherlands Air Force – on Volkel Airbase, restoration for display during the Airforce days set on June 14 & 15 2019 Volkel Airbase.
D-8245 Royal Netherlands Air Force – gateguard at the  Nationaal Militair Museum, Soesterberg.
D-8259 Royal Netherlands Air Force – on display at Regionaal Opleidings Centrum, Amsterdam Airport
D-8268 Royal Netherlands Air Force – gateguard at Deltion College, Zwolle.
D-8279 Royal Netherlands Air Force – on display at Volkel Air Base
D-8318 Royal Netherlands Air Force – gateguard at Leeuwarden air base
FX45 Belgian Air Force – gate guardian at Autosloperij Ad Stouten, Oosterland, Zeeland, painted as 'D-8030' Royal Netherlands Air Force.
KG-101 German Air Force – stored at PS Aero at Baarlo.  Has been sold to a private owner. 

TF-104G
D-5803 Royal Netherlands Air Force – stored with Nationaal Militair Museum
D-5805 Royal Netherlands Air Force – stored with Nationaal Militair Museum
D-5806 Royal Netherlands Air Force – stored with Nationaal Militair Museum

Norway
Airworthy
CF-104D
104637 – Bodø Main Air Station. Civilian registration LN-STF.

On display
CF-104
104717 – Flyhistorisk Museum, Sola, gate guard.
104730 – Flyhistorisk Museum, Sola.
104755 – Kjeller Airport.
104766 – Kjeller Airport, gate guard. 
104800 – Norwegian Aviation Museum. 
104801 – Norwegian Aviation Museum.
104870 – Bodø Main Air Station.
104882 – GKN Aerospace, Kongsberg, gate guard.
104886 – In private ownership/under restoration at Norwegian Armed Forces Aircraft Collection.
104889 – Sandefjord Airport, Torp.
F-104G
24+64 – Bodø Main Air Station, gate guard. Ex-German Air Force, painted as RF-104G 61-2626 "FN-B".
TF-104G
63-8469 – Norwegian Armed Forces Aircraft Collection.

Pakistan
F-104A
56-798, On display at the PAF Museum.
F-104B
57-1309 (ex-USAF) – Pakistan Air Force Museum, in Karachi.

Spain
F-104G
26+23 German Air Force – Air Museum of Spain, in Madrid. The aircraft is an ex-Luftwaffe machine that used to retain its German markings on the left side with Spanish markings on the right side. In its last refurbishment, on show from November 2017, it was changed to a total Spanish livery.
63-13643, which flew first for Spain (1965-1972) and then Greece (1972-1991) before being retired from service, was stored until September 2017, when it was returned to Torrejon AB, Spain, and restored to its Spanish livery for static display.

Switzerland
F-104S
MM6830 (ex Italian air Force) – Displayed at a roundabout just next to the airport of Grenchen. Now painted in USAF colours as FG-903. In the past it was painted in a blue white breitling scheme. Earlier it was painted as USAF FG-875

Turkey
As follows:

F-104G
61-2619 – Istanbul Aviation Museum.
61-2620 – Adnan Menderes Airport.
61-2633 – Gaziemir, İzmir.
62-344 – Istanbul Atatürk Airport.
62-733 – Istanbul Military Museum.
62-12239 – Işıklar Military High School, Bursa.
62-12316 – İnciraltı, İzmir.
62-12344 – Istanbul Aviation Museum.
63-12718 – Antalya Airport.
63-12733 – Istanbul University.
2045 – Balıkesir Airport.
2066 – Diyarbakır Airport.
6622 – Military Museum, Balıkesir.
6667 – Eskisehir Aviation Museum.
7005 – Mersin.
7047 – Air War College.
7051 – Akıncı Air Base.
7108 – Diyarbakır Air Base.
7122 – Balıkesir.
7125 – Celal Bayar University.
7161 – Işıklar Military High School.
7164 – Akhisar Air Base.
7185 – Eskişehir Air Base.
7186 – Bandırma, Balıkesir.
7190 – Anadolu University.
7209 – Yalova Airport.
7304 – Bandırma Air Base.
8060 – Marmaris Airport.
8090 – Bandırma Air Base.
8105 – Ankara University.
8168 – Kocaeli University.
8205 – Etimesgut Aviation Museum.
8277 – Yesilyurt, İstanbul.
8284 – Karadeniz Technical University.
8286 – Erzurum University.
8299 – İzmir Air Base.
8321 – Batman.
8346 – Marmara University.
8347 – İnciraltı, İzmir.
9052 – Bodrum, Muğla.
9078 – Yeşilyurt Military High School.
9083 – Yeşilyurt Military High School.
9135 – Erzurum.
9145 – Balıkesir Air Base.
10–101 – İncirlik Air Base.
s/n unknown – Middle East Technical University.

F-104S
6859 – Etimesgut, Ankara.
6862 – Pamukkale University.
6868 – Istanbul Aviation Museum.
6895 – Rahmi Koç Museum.
7017 – Merzifon Air Base, Samsun.
6-186 – Bandırma, Balıkesir.

CF-104
104711 – Etimesgut Aviation Museum.
104713 – Diyarbakır Air Base.
104733 – Istanbul Military Museum.
104751 – Eskisehir Aerospace Factory.
104770 – Etimesgut Aviation Museum.
104808 – Diyarbakır Air Base.
104810 – Etimesgut Barracks, Ankara.
104841 – Diyarbakır Air Base.
104869 – Ordu.
104873 – Akıncı Air Base.
104891 – Diyarbakır Air Base.
4-260 – Akıncı Air Base.
4-733 – Hendek, Sakarya.
4-955 – Osmancık, Çorum.

CF-104D
104642 – Etimesgut Aviation Museum.

TF-104G
65-9415 – Çorlu, Tekirdağ.
5703 – Erciyes University.
5711 – Yeşilköy, İstanbul.
5721 – Kütahya Airport.
5722 – Afyon Airport.
5725 – Istanbul Aviation Museum.
67-5945 – Ahili, Kırıkkale Merkez/Kırıkkale.

United Kingdom

F-104G
R-756 Royal Danish Air Force – Midland Air Museum, Coventry, England.
22+35 German Air Force – Bruntingthorpe Aircraft Museum, Bruntingthorpe, Leicestershire, England.
22+57 German Air Force – Bruntingthorpe Aircraft Museum, Bruntingthorpe, Leicestershire, England.

United States

Airworthy
TF-104G-M
54251 – based at Starfighters Inc in Cape Canaveral, Florida.  
54258 – based at Starfighters Inc in Cape Canaveral, Florida.
54261 – based at Starfighters Inc in Cape Canaveral, Florida.

On display
YF-104A
55-2961 (NASA N818NA) – hanging from the ceiling of the Smithsonian's National Air and Space Museum, Washington, D.C.
55-2967 – Pueblo Weisbrod Aircraft Museum, Pueblo, Colorado.

F-104A
56-0732 – McGhee Tyson Air National Guard Base, Alcoa, Tennessee.  Formerly on display at Octave Chanute Aerospace Museum, Chanute AFB (formerly), Rantoul, Illinois.
56-0748 – Linear Air Park, Dyess AFB, Abilene, Texas.
56-0750 – Michigan 104, Canton, Michigan.
56-0752 – Travis AFB Heritage Center, Travis AFB, Fairfield, California.
56-0753 – Hill Aerospace Museum, Utah.
56-0754 – National Museum of the United States Air Force, Wright-Patterson AFB, Dayton, Ohio.
56-0755 - March Field Air Museum, Riverside, California
56-0756 (painted as 56-0751) – Nevada County Air Park, Grass Valley, California.
56-0760 – USAF Test Pilots School, Edwards AFB, Palmdale, California.
56-0778 – Warhawk Air Museum, Nampa, Idaho.
56-0780 (formerly 56-0779) – Cavanaugh Flight Museum, Addison, Texas.
56-0786 – Cavanaugh Flight Museum, Addison, Texas.
56-0790 (NASA N820NA) – Century Circle at Edwards Air Force Base, near Rosamond, California.
56-0813 – Easton Airport (Maryland), Easton, MD.
56-0817 – Pacific Aviation Museum on loan from Museum of Aviation, Robins AFB, Warner Robins, Georgia.
56-0826 – Historic Aviation Memorial Museum, Tyler, Texas.

F-104B
57-1301 – Kansas Cosmosphere, Hutchinson, Kansas.
57-1303 (NASA N819NA) – Aerospace Museum of California at the former McClellan AFB in Sacramento, California.
57-1305, (painted as 57-1319), – Kelly Field (formerly Kelly AFB), San Antonio, Texas.
57-1330 – Castle Air Museum, Atwater, California.

F-104C

56-0886 – Holloman AFB, New Mexico.
56-0890 – Tennessee ANGB – 134th ARG, Maryville, Tennessee.It is fixed to a pedestal and serves as a monument.
56-0891 – Arizona ANGB – 161st ARG, Phoenix, Arizona.It is fixed to a pedestal and serves as a monument.
56-0892 – Luke AFB, Phoenix, Arizona.
56-0898 – Kalamazoo Air Zoo, Kalamazoo, Michigan.
56-0901 – New England Air Museum, Bradley International Airport. in Windsor Locks, Connecticut.
56-0910 – Wings Over the Rockies Air and Space Museum (former Lowry AFB) in Denver, Colorado
56-0912 – Sheppard AFB, Wichita Falls, Texas.It is fixed to a pedestal and left as a monument.
56-0914 – National Museum of the United States Air Force, Wright-Patterson AFB, Dayton, Ohio.
56-0919 – gate guardian at the 165th Air Support Operations Squadron and 224th Joint Communications Support Squadron facility, Georgia Air National Guard, Brunswick, Georgia.It is fixed to a pedestal and left as a monument.
56-0926 – Veterans Memorial Park in Valley City, North Dakota.It is fixed to a pedestal and left as a monument.
56-0929 – Southern Museum of Flight, Birmingham, Alabama.

56-0932 – Stafford Air & Space Museum, Weatherford, Oklahoma (erroneously painted as 60932).It is fixed to a pedestal and left as a monument.
56-0933 – Mid-America Air Museum, Liberal Municipal Airport, Liberal, Kansas.
56-0934 – Museum of Flight in Seattle, Washington.
56-0936 (painted as F-104A 56-0808) – Peterson Air and Space Museum, Peterson AFB, Colorado.It is fixed to a pedestal and left as a monument.
56-0938 – Keesler AFB, Biloxi, Mississippi.It is fixed to a pedestal and left as a monument.
57-0915 – Joe Davies Heritage Airpark at Palmdale Plant 42, Palmdale, California.
57-0916 – Virginia Air & Space Center near Langley AFB in Hampton, Virginia.
57-0920 – Memorial Park, McEntire ANGB, Columbia, South Carolina.It is fixed to a pedestal and left as a monument.
57-0929 – Muñiz Air National Guard Base at Luis Muñoz Marín International Airport, San Juan, Puerto Rico.

F-104D
57-1314 (painted as F-104B 57-1312) – Castle Air Museum at the former Castle AFB in Atwater, California.
57-1323 – Pima Air and Space Museum adjacent to Davis-Monthan AFB in Tucson, Arizona.
57-1331 – Air Force Armament Museum, at Eglin AFB, Florida.
57-1332 – American Legion Post 64 in Dutton, Montana.
57-1333 – California Science Center, Los Angeles, California.
57-1334 – George Izay Park located at Burbank, California.

F-104G
D-8331 (Royal Netherlands Air Force) – Science Museum Oklahoma, Oklahoma City, Oklahoma.
FX-81 (Belgian Air Force, painted as Royal Netherlands Air Force "D-8090") – Inde Motorsports Ranch,  Willcox, Arizona.
FX-82 (Belgian Air Force) – Planes of Fame Air Museum, Chino, California.
FX-84 (Belgian Air Force, painted as NASA N813NA) – Evergreen Aviation and Space Museum, McMinnville, Oregon.
KG200 (NASA N826NA) – Dryden Flight Research Center located inside Edwards Air Force Base, California.

TF-104G
61-3065 (NASA N824NA) – Estrella War Birds Museum at Paso Robles, California.
buno (NASA N825NA) - Moffett Historical Museum, Moffett Federal Airfield, California.

F-104N (NASA)
N811NA – Embry-Riddle Aeronautical University Prescott, Arizona campus. It was flown by Neil Armstrong.
N812NA – Lockheed Martin Skunk Works facility, Palmdale, California.

Under Restoration or in Storage
F-104B
56-1296 – to airworthiness by Starfighters Inc in Cape Canaveral, Florida.
TF-104G
KF+226 – to airworthiness by Classic Aircraft Aviation Museum Hillsboro, Oregon.

Notes

References

Chanute Air Museum, Rantoul Illinois, F-104C on display, formerly used as display aircraft at Telephone Center, CAFB

Lockheed F-104
Survivors